The Apartments at 2 Collier Road were built by developer Henry M. Rice in 1929 in Atlanta, Georgia. The apartments were built on lands formerly belonging to George Washington Collier.

References

Apartment buildings in Atlanta
Colonial Revival architecture in Georgia (U.S. state)
National Register of Historic Places in Atlanta
Residential buildings completed in 1929
Residential buildings on the National Register of Historic Places in Georgia (U.S. state)